The 2009–10 Connecticut Huskies men's basketball team represented the University of Connecticut in the 2009–2010 NCAA Division I basketball season. The Huskies were coached by Jim Calhoun and played their home games at the XL Center in Hartford, Connecticut, and on campus at the Harry A. Gampel Pavilion in Storrs, Connecticut. The Huskies are a member of the Big East Conference. They finished the season 18–16, 7–11 in Big East play and lost in the first round of the 2010 Big East men's basketball tournament. They were invited to the 2010 National Invitation Tournament and advanced to the second round before losing to Virginia Tech.

Preseason
Senior Jerome Dyson and sophomore Kemba Walker were named to the All-BIG EAST Preseason Team while senior Stanley Robinson garnered All-BIG EAST Honorable Mention accolades.

Roster changes
UConn was hit hard due to the graduation of starters Jeff Adrien, A. J. Price, and Craig Austrie.  They were also without center Hasheem Thabeet who decided to enter the NBA at the end of the 2008-09 season.

Recruiting class

Schedule

|-
!colspan=9| Exhibition

|-
!colspan=9| Regular season

|-
!colspan=9| Big East tournament

|-
!colspan=10| 2010 National Invitation Tournament

Roster

Depth chart

Broadcasters
Locally, the Connecticut Huskies we're broadcast on local radio by the UCONN Radio Network, with flagship station, WTIC–AM in Hartford, Connecticut.

Rankings

See also
2009–10 Big East Conference men's basketball season
2010 NCAA Men's Division I Basketball Tournament
2009–10 Connecticut Huskies women's basketball team

Notes

UConn Huskies men's basketball seasons
Connecticut Huskies
Connecticut
Connecticut Huskies men's b
Connecticut Huskies men's b